Nanjing Yoyo Football Club was a Chinese football club which played in the China Jia League from 2003 to 2010. Founded in 2002 as the Liaoning Xingguang F.C., it was based on the youth team of Liaoning FC. In 2003, they were bought by SVT Group and renamed Nanjing Yoyo. The club finished bottom of the Jia League in 2010 and were due to play in League Two during the following campaign. However, due to wage issues, the Chinese Football Association denied the club entry into League Two, with the club dissolving soon afterwards.

Results
All-time League Rankings

References

External links
 BBS on Xici.net

Football clubs in China
Sport in Nanjing
Association football clubs established in 2003
Association football clubs disestablished in 2011
2003 establishments in China
2011 disestablishments in China
Defunct football clubs in China